The 2022 Women's Junior Oceania Cup was the sixth edition of the Junior Oceania Cup for women. The tournament consisted of three test matches between the national under–21 teams of Australia and New Zealand. It was held at the National Hockey Centre in Canberra, Australia from 8–11 December.

The tournament served as a qualifier for the 2023 FIH Junior World Cup to be held in Santiago, Chile. As only two national associations will participate, both teams will automatically qualify as the OHF receives two qualification places.

Squads
The squads were named on 7 November and 25 October, respectfully.

Head Coach: Stacia Strain

Jade Smith
Ruby Harris
Maddison Brooks
Hannah Kable
Gracie Geddis
Georgina West
Makayla Jones
Alana Kavanagh
Neasa Flynn
Carly Hoffmann
Zali Ward
Josie Lawton (C)
Tatum Stewart
Emily Hamilton-Smith
Ciara Utri
Jolie Sertorio
Evie Dalton (GK)
Bridget Lauranace (GK)

Head Coach: Mitchell Hayde

Emily Baker
Paige Blake
Breana Catley
Brodie Cochrane (GK)
Hannah Cotter
Jaimee Eades
Emma Findlay
Isabella Gill (C)
Sophie Hildesley
Leah Hodges
Jessica Kelly
Emily Logan
Alice McIlroy-Foster (GK)
Rhianna Pho
Tessa Reid
Annabelle Schneideman
Issy Story
Brittany Wang

Results
All times are local (AEDT).

Standings

Fixtures

Goalscorers

References

External links
Oceania Hockey Federation 

International women's field hockey competitions hosted by Australia
Junior Oceania Cup
Junior Oceania Cup
Oceania Cup